Kırşehirspor with club code 000212 was a sports club located in Kirşehir, Turkey. It was founded as Kırşehirspor in 1969 and later dissolved. The current Kırşehirspor name and club, with club code 010954, is the changed name of Yeni Kırşehirspor, founded in 1984. It was renamed as PETLAS Kırşehirspor in 1999 and Yeni Kırşehirspor in 2001.

Kırşehir Belediyespor founded in 2013 as Yeşil Kırşehirspor, with club code 010945 is another club from Kırşehir.

Attendances
 TFF First League: 1982–84, 1986–87
 TFF Second League: 1969–75, 1984–86, 1987–93, 1999–01, 2003–09
 TFF Third League: 2001–03, 2009–11
 Turkish Regional Amateur League: 2011–

References

External links 
Kırşehirspor on TFF.org

 
Sport in Kirşehir
Football clubs in Turkey
Association football clubs established in 1984
1984 establishments in Turkey